Louga (Wolof: Luga) is a town in northwestern Senegal.  Louga is a cattle market centre, and has road and rail links with the port city of Saint-Louis to the northwest and Dakar to the southwest.  The area surrounding Louga is at the northern limits of Senegal's peanut- (groundnut-) growing area and is inhabited by the Fulani, who are generally pastoral nomads, and the Wolof, who are sedentary farmers. Louga is located in what is called the Ndiambour, which used to be part of the Cayor province.

Administration 
Louga is both the capital of the Louga department and of the Louga region.

The administrative region of Louga was formed in 1976, divided into 3 departments with 11 districts and 48 communities. There are 7 municipalities.

The Louga region is made up of 3 departments:

 Louga
 Kebemer
 Linguere

Geography 
The closest towns are Dagadj, Bayakh, Taoua, Laye, Mbarom and Ngueye Dili. The capital of Senegal, Dakar, is 203 km away. The climate is dry, almost desertlike, with a long dry season called the harmattan that can last 9 months or more. This season carries dust to Louga and occasionally causes sandstorms, promoting wind erosion and water loss by evaporation.

Population 
The main ethnic groups are the Wolof, the Fula, the Toucouleur, and the Moors.

Economy 

Agriculture is the main sector of Louga's economy. Fishing is practiced on the 50 km sea front in Potou.

Transport 

Louga is a junction station on the Dakar-Niger Railway network.

Sports
Stade ASEC Ndiambour, better known as Stade Alboury Ndiaye, is a multi-use stadium. It is currently used mostly for football matches and serves as a home ground of ASEC Ndiambour. The stadium holds 15,000 people.

Twin Towns 
Millau, France

Notable People Born in Louga 

 Momar Gaye Diop, first mayor of Louga in 1956
 Mansour Bouna Ndiaye, former deputy mayor of Louga
 Abdiou Diouf, former president of Senegal (1981-2000)
 Abass Sall
 Sam Mbaye (1924-1998), son of Mame Cheikh Mbaye, Islamologist
 Djily Mbaye (1927-1991), also son of Mame Cheikh Mbaye, marabout, patron, and builder of the major infrastructures of Louga
 Badou Ndiaye, guitarist, former conductor of the Etoile de Dakar
 Oustaz Cheikh Tidiane Gaye (1951-2011), Islamologist, Arabic-speaking writer and lecturer
 Ahmadou Sakhir Lô (1903-1988), founder of the Islamic institute of Coki founded in 1939
 Khalifa Sall, former mayor of Dakar
 Aminata Mbengue Ndiaye, mayor of Louga from 2009 to 2014
 Moustapha Diop, current mayor of Louga since 2014
 Samba Khary Cissé, current president of the regional council
 Chérif Thiam, painter
 Haïdar El Ali, Minister of Ecology and Nature Protection
 Mubarack Lô, economist and politician
 Modou Mbery Sylla
 Pope Momar Gaye, accountant
 Oustaz Ahmad Moubarack LO, founder of Manar Al Houda

See also 
 Railway stations in Senegal

References

External links 
 Peace Corps Senegal, Louga Page

Regional capitals in Senegal
Populated places in Louga Region
Communes of Senegal
Senegal geography articles needing translation from French Wikipedia